The Qatar Museums (QM) Public Art Department is responsible for overseeing the installation of artwork by renowned artists in the public realm in Qatar, creating an artist residency program for young local artists to help them develop their skills and horizons, organizing exhibitions featuring international artists and developing an online community of creative talent in Qatar and beyond. The QM has an ambitious plan that aims to make Qatar a world class cultural destination, notably in modern and contemporary art.

Sheikha Al Mayassa Bint Hamad Al Thani, QM Chairperson has said: “Through displaying various forms of art in public space, we aim to inspire local talent and establish an organic connection between art and the local community.”

Public Art at Hamad International Airport
QM were planning to introduce travellers and visitors to the growing culture and art scene in Qatar before they even set foot out of the new Hamad International Airport. With several art installations in place, one of which is the Untitled (Lamp/Bear) by Urs Fischer, and more planned to be installed.

Untitled (Lamp/Bear) by Urs Fischer

The Untitled (Lamp/Bear) will be situated in the main space as part of the retail Gallery at the new Hamad International Airport.

Cube by Ahmed Al Bahrani

Bronze sculpture by Ahmed Al Bahrani, depicting a 1.5 m bronze cube.

Tom Otterness 
Tom Otterness (born 1952) is an American sculptor best known as one of America's most prolific public artists.

Playground 

The Playground sculptures number from 20 to 30 and were made to be of various cultural backgrounds. There will eventually be three separate installations at the airport titled "Playground", two of which have already been installed:
Activity Node 3 – Bronze
Activity Node 4 – Bronze

Other Worlds 
Other Worlds is an installation consisting of eight bronze sculptures placed in Terminal C. It was completed in 2014, and features functional playgrounds as well as human sculptures.

Oryxes by Tom Claassen

, a Dutch artist, produced a series of Arabian oryx sculpture pieces in bronze. These are currently situated in the East Garden Court of the new Hamad International Airport.

Mappes Monde by Adel Abdessemed
Adel Abdessemed created two pieces of artwork for the Hamad International Airport titled Mappes Monde. The installation features two global maps which were modeled from tin cans. They are identified as Day and Night and are large printed steel pieces which hang on the walls at the Concourse A Pierhead.

Untitled by Rudolf Stingel
Untitled is an art piece by Rudolf Stingel which is located in the Arrivals Meet and Greet Hall in the West of Hamad International Airport. The art piece is made up of three surfaces that were covered with reflective aluminum panels. Before the opening of the airport, the artist asked members of the construction team to draw on these three surfaces. Later on, the artist cast the three surfaces in copper and then coated it with gold.

A Message of Peace to the World by Ahmed Al Bahrani
Ahmed Al Bahrani created the art piece A Message of Peace to the World, which is located in the Passenger Train's South Node station. This art piece was inspired by the work of Reach Out to Asia, which is a non-profit organization in Qatar that aims to support primary and secondary education in countries in Asia that are underprivileged. The art piece is inspired by their logo and by their efforts.

Flying Man by Dia Al-Azzawi 
Flying Man is an art piece by the Iraqi artist Dia Al-Azzawi which is located in the East and West ends, in the Arrivals Meet and Greet Hall. The art piece consists of two sculptures that are based on the story of a historical figure, Abu Firnas. Abu Firnas is one of the first Muslim pioneers to test out flying. The inspiration behind the two art sculptures is the pillars that were in Mesopotamia, which was an ancient region.

Small Lie by KAWS
SMALL LIE is an art piece by the American artist KAWS, which is located in the North node of Hamad International Airport. The sculpture resembles a wooden marionette, is 32 feet tall, made of Afrormosia wood and weighs 15 tonnes. The inspiration behind the art sculpture is wooden toys and its intention is to make the person standing in front of it feel small.

Cosmos by Othoniel 
The French artist Jean-Michel Othoniel created the art sculpture Cosmos, which is located in the North node of Hamad International Airport. The sculpture is inspired by an artefact that is in the Museum of Islamic Art in Qatar, which is the world's oldest Islamic astrolabe. The sculpture resembles the different paths that the passengers take around the world.

Arctic Nurseries of El Dorado by Marc Quinn
Arctic Nurseries of El Dorado is an art piece by the British artist Marc Quinn, which is located in the departures hall before passport control. The artist has been interested in different flowers since 2000. He combined his interest in flowers, specifically the orchid, with his interest in genetic manipulation and DNA. The sculpture is formed from various orchids connected together in the form of DNA. It is made up bronze and is covered in white pigment.

Capture the Essence of Qatar Photographic Competition Winners
"Capture the Essence of Qatar" was a juried photography competition by Qatar Museums and Hamad International Airport allowing participants to showcase their very best creative and imaginative images of Qatar in digital photography.

The competition celebrates the achievements of Qatar, past and present, and the passion of the people who live and work within it. It aims to represent the country's heritage, culture and the Qatar National Vision 2030 under one of the four main pillars of the vision:
 Human Development
 Social Development
 Economic Development
 Environmental Development
Four winners were selected and represented at the new Hamad International Airport in the Departure Hall on large screens.

Paintings by local Qatari artists

A number of local artists have been selected by the Qatar Museums to have their artwork displayed in various lounges and public spaces around the airport:
 Dialogue with self 1, Amal Al Aathem
 Relaxations, Salman Al Malik
 Steps, Salman Al Malik
 Reflection of a Man, Amal Al Rabban
 Heart 1, Mubarak Al Malik
 Heart 2, Mubarak Al Malik
 Calligraphy 1, Hessa Kalla
 Depth 1, Ahmed Al Hamar
 Depth 2, Ahmed Al Hamar
 Heritage 2, Wadha Al Sulaiti
 Heritage 3, Wadha Al Sulaiti
 Shift to Light I, Yousef Ahmad
 Shift to Light II, Yousef Ahmad
 Shift to Light III, Yousef Ahmad

Maman by Louise Bourgeois

Maman, a 30-foot-tall bronze-cast spider sculpture located at the Qatar National Convention Center of Qatar Foundation, is an ode from renowned French-American artist Louise Bourgeois to her mother, who worked as a weaver in France.

7 by Richard Serra

The sculpture is very popular to viewers around the world and has made appearances in several cities such as London, Paris, Geneva, Buenos Aires and St Petersburg.
Commissioned by the QM, Richard Serra's landmark 7, an 80-foot steel sculpture, is the tallest public art piece in Qatar and the tallest Richard Serra has ever conceived. As a focal point of MIA Park, the sculpture is also Serra's first sculpture to be showcased in the Middle East. Constructed from seven steel plates arranged in a heptagonal shape, the work celebrates the scientific and spiritual significance of the number seven in Islamic culture.

East-West/West-East by Richard Serra

Qatar Museums unveiled a major landscape commission, East-West/West-East, by American artist Richard Serra in the Zekreet Peninsula in western Qatar, approximately 60 kilometres from the capital Doha, GPS: N25° 31.019’ E50° 51.948’

Set in a natural corridor formed by gypsum plateaus, East-West/West-East spans over a kilometre in length, and crosses the peninsula of the Brouq Nature Reserve connecting the waters of the Gulf. East-West/West-East consists of four steel plates measured by their relation to the topography. The plates, which rise to 14.7 meters and 16.7 meters above the ground, are level to each other; they are also level to the gypsum plateaus on either side. Despite the great distance that the plates span, all four can be seen and explored from either end of the sculpture.

Gandhi's Three Monkeys by Subodh Gupta

Three sculptures by Indian artist Subodh Gupta, Gandhi's Three Monkeys were installed at Katara Cultural Village. As homage to India's famous leader of peace, Mahatma Gandhi, Gupta uses steel and worn brass domestic utensils to form a soldier, a terrorist and a man wearing a gas mask to represent Gandhi's three monkeys “See no evil, Hear no evil, Speak no evil”.

The Force of Nature II by Lorenzo Quinn
The Force of Nature II is part of Lorenzo Quinn’s art sculptures collection. He has a total of 4 The Force of Nature II sculptures worldwide, with one located in the Katara Cultural Village in Doha, Qatar. It is made up of bronze, stainless steel and aluminum. It was installed in Katara in October, 2011.

Perceval by Sarah Lucas
Perceval by British artist Sarah Lucas is a life-sized bronze sculpture of a Shire horse pulling a cart with two oversized squash installed at the Aspire Park in Doha. The subject matter reflects Lucas' fondness for re-examining everyday objects in unusual contexts.

eL Seed in Doha: Calligraffiti Project

QM's Public Art Department and the Public Works Authority (Ashghal) commissioned French-Tunisian eL Seed to adorn four tunnels on Salwa Road with calligraffiti murals. Each of the 52 murals features unique themes inspired by anecdotes from Qatari culture and markers of Qatari life.

Healthy Living From The Start by Anne Geddes
The QM commissioned Anne Geddes to produce a series of 12 images capturing local athletes with newborn babies and young children. Located at the main hallway of the Women's Hospital affiliated with the Hamad Medical Corporation, the images are part of an initiative by QMA Chairperson to raise awareness on Diabetes 2 and the importance of engaging in sports activities at an early age.

The Miraculous Journey by Damien Hirst

The Miraculous Journey (2005–2013) by British Artist Damien Hirst consists of 14 gigantic bronze sculptures that chart the gestation of a human being from conception to birth, ending with a statue of a 46-foot-tall anatomically correct baby boy. The installation is located in front of the Sidra Medical and Research Center, a new academic medical facility specialising in patient care for women and children in Qatar. The figures range in height from 4.8 metres to 10.7 metres, and weigh between 9 and 28 tonnes each.

Buscando la luz IV by Eduardo Chillida
Qatar Museums unveils Public Art commission by the Basque artist Eduardo Chillida at Qatar University, Doha, Qatar. Buscando la luz IV (Searching for Light IV) is the last among a series of sculptures of monumental scale produced by Chillida throughout his final creative period. The abstract piece integrates in itself the fundamental concepts inside the artist's labor. The dialogue between matter and space; the creation of sites; the organic nature of forms; and a strong ethical content are all notions that conform Chillida's body of work. The three asymmetrical steel plates that compose the sculpture are linked to each other through a complex riveting system, which delimitates in its interior a place for human encounters. The artist plays with the scale and invites us to enter the interior space of the work. Once inside, its undulant forms appear to acquire movement, raising up in search of the light.

References

External links 
 Qatar Museums homepage (English)